"Schoolgirl" is the first single from the 1986 album Another Step by Kim Wilde. 

Released in Australia and several European countries (although not the UK), it was the first single of Wilde's career on which she was given co-writing credits. She was given sole writing and production credits on "Songs About Love", the B-side to the single. "Schoolgirl" was inspired by Wilde's younger sister, Roxanne, and was written shortly after the Chernobyl disaster.

The 12" release of the single featured an extended remix called the Head Master-Mix.

Chart performance

References

1986 singles
1986 songs
Kim Wilde songs
Songs written by Marty Wilde
Songs written by Ricky Wilde
Songs written by Kim Wilde
Songs about school